Ultimate Beastmaster is an American sports entertainment reality show competition that premiered on Netflix on February 24, 2017. The show differentiates itself from other obstacle course competition shows by showcasing not only international talent, but by producing six localized versions, featuring select television hosts, actors, comedians and athletes as commentators from the six countries competing in the show. Reactions from all countries' hosts appear in each localized versions, especially during course clearing victories. Each season consists of 10 episodes, released simultaneously on Netflix worldwide. The first season premiered on February 24, 2017, while the second season aired on Netflix on December 15, 2017.

In February 2018, the show was renewed for a third season, consisting of nine episodes, which premiered on August 31, 2018.

Premise
In each episode, there are twelve contestants (two from each country) who run a new obstacle course known as “The Beast”. The winner is crowned “Beastmaster”. Each of the "Beastmasters" from the nine Beastmaster episodes will go forward to a final course, to become the Ultimate Beastmaster. Starting in Season 3, each show featured nine competitors (one from each country in the competition). The two competitors with the highest score in the final stage moved onto one of two semi-finals. The top three from each semi-final moved to the final episode to be crowned Ultimate Beastmaster.

Hosts
In addition to Sylvester Stallone hosting season 1, each country has its own set of two hosts/commentators for the competition. They are as follows:

Not only do each pair of hosts provide color commentary for each of the 6-9 localized versions, but the foreign commentators also make appearances in each localized version, with their commentary presented by subtitles. If a contestant completes a course, all hosts' reactions are shown on screen. Furthermore, since all host booths are placed in a row on the Ultimate Beastmaster set, commentators from one localization can easily walk into the booth of another localized version.

The Beast (Season 1) 
The obstacle course for the competition is known as The Beast, and it is divided into 4 Levels. Competitors with the highest scores after each level move on while those with the lowest scores are eliminated. Scores accumulate on levels 1–3, with ties decided in favor of the competitor who finished the farthest the fastest. The obstacles are suspended over a body of red-tinted water referred to as Beast Blood and housed in a giant steel frame that takes the form of a large animal. A competitor is considered to have failed a Level if all four limbs are submerged into the Beast Blood. Failure ends the attempt at the current Level, but confers no penalties; except in the case of Level 3's The Hard Way, in which completing additional challenges nets bonus points but failure removes points.

The winner of each episode is crowned the title Beastmaster. The nine beastmasters of all episodes then compete against each other in the final episode (episode 10). The winner, if completed the entire level 4 (reaching the top of The Power Source and obtained the final Point Thruster at the summit), is crowned the Ultimate Beastmaster and awarded $50,000.

Level 1 
In Level 1 all twelve competitors compete with the top eight scorers moving on.

 Jaw Breaker - Competitors must cross a series of parallel horizontal bars.
 Mother Tongue - Competitors must scale a 30 ft plank at a 45° angle with no grips, then jump onto a small climbing wall mounted above the ramp and successfully climb onto the ledge.
 Brain Matter - Competitors cross a 16" wide (reduced to 6" for the finals) suspended balance beam with the aid of a small gear handle above their head. The first Points Thruster is located midway along Brain Matter.
 Throat Erosion - Replacing Mother Tongue and  Brain Matter in certain episodes, competitors must use an industrial trampoline to jump and grab a lever releasing a climbing wall.
 Face Plant - Competitors stand on a narrow platform, hands braced against panels on either side, as they are tilted forward to a 45° angle. They must then jump to a rope (sometimes a chain) and swing to the Energy Coils.
 Energy Coils -  Competitors must jump across a series of 6 semi-stationary hanging platform at various heights. The second (first if competitors faced Throat Erosion instead of Brain Matter) Point Thruster is located next to a side platform.
 Death Slide: Competitors must crawl through a chute that sinks one foot each five seconds to jump on to Mag Wall.
 Mag Wall - Competitors navigate horizontally across a climbing wall. Periodically the magnetic handholds are released and fall to the Beast's blood. The wall features an inversion, from which the competitors must jump to the finishing platform. A third and final Point Thruster was added toward the end of Mag Wall during the finals.

Each portion of an obstacle is worth 5 points allowing for a possible total of at least 50 Points, depending on The Beast's configuration.

Level 2 
In Level 2 the top eight competitors compete, with the top five scorers moving on.

 Spinal Ascent - Competitors must complete a series of vertical jumps, with the largest being 8 feet. Three platforms are fixed, while two are suspended.
 Spinal Descent - Competitors must work their way down through a cable web, the cables becoming thinner and thinner toward the bottom. A Point Thruster is located at the bottom.
 Stomach Churn - Competitors must traverse three spinning platforms all at varying heights.
 Digestive Track - Jumping from the platform into a tube, competitors must climb the tube before it sinks and jump to the next obstacle.
 Dreadmills - Competitors must cross 2 suspended treadmills and leap to a platform. 
 Chain Reaction - Competitors must swing across a series of hanging chains. A Point Thruster is located midway across.
 Vertebrace - Competitors must hop through a series of five suspended vertebrae-shaped hoops and jump to the finish platform. A Point Thruster is located at the left of the second vertebrae.

Each portion of an obstacle is worth 5 points allowing for a possible total of at least 110 points.

Level 3 (Energy Pyramid) 

In Level 3, also known as the Energy Pyramid, the top 5 scorers compete, with the top two advancing to the final level.

 The Ejector - Competitors must mount a 14 MPH forward-moving treadmill and attempt to grab a suspended rope handle (attached to Prism Strike).
 Prism Strike - Competitors must hold onto the rope handle as it swings through a curved track. A Points Thruster is located to the side of the track roughly midway through.
 The Coil Crawl - Competitors must work their way through a tube structure made of pipe and chain before it sinks into the water.

At the end of the Coil Crawl competitors must make a choice between two paths. If competitors choose to go right (The Easy Way) they only have to complete one more obstacle:

 The Extractor - Competitors must climb a series of 15 hanging poles to reach a high platform.

If competitors choose to go left (The Hard Way) they have a chance to do three bonus obstacles:

 Bungee Beds - Competitors must traverse three unstable platforms suspended at varying heights by bungee chords. This obstacle has mats beneath, and a competitor fails if any part of their body touches the mat.
 Tricky Trapeze - Competitors must use their momentum to swing across three trapeze bars. The first bar is held magnetically in place and will instantly release upon being grabbed. The next two bars are suspended on a pulley which enables them to shift from side-to-side further making traversing them far harder.
 Weapon - Competitors must use grip handles to slide across 2 sets of v-shaped bars. The first set descends to the second set. The competitor then had to jump to the finish platform.

Portions of obstacles (excluding those on the bonus course) are worth 5 points each. Every portion of a bonus obstacle is worth 10 points each, and a competitor may choose to accept their bonus score and decline the remaining obstacle(s). Failure on any of the bonus obstacles forfeits any bonus points and suffers a 30-point penalty. When you make it to the final platform you earn  100 points.

Level 4 (The Power Source) 
In Level 4 all scores are reset to 0 and the top 2 competitors face each other on The Power Source, an eighty-foot climbing wall, with the top 1 being the Ultimate Beastmaster for the finals.

 Foundation - Competitors navigate a wall of increasingly small handholds.
 Grid Lock - Instead of handholds, competitors must climb using 2-inch-wide slots cut into the surface in a grid-like pattern.
 Ventilator - Competitors must ascend a narrow vertical crevice.
 High Voltage - Competitors face a sheer vertical surface with only two extremely narrow ledges.
 There is a final Point Thruster at the summit of The Power Source.

Along all four sections of the Power Source are Energy Taps, green buttons which the competitors must touch in order to gain points. Each Energy Tap is worth ten points, except the 2 energy Taps from High Voltage which are worth 40 points. Competitors are given six minutes to accumulate the highest possible score, with ties decided in favor of the competitor who is currently highest on the tower. There is no failure condition for the Power Source, and competitors may attempt to regain their footing if they lose grip on the tower/wall or fall.

The Beast (Season 2) 
The obstacle course for the competition is known as The Beast, and it is divided into 4 Levels. Competitors with the highest scores after each level move on while those with the lowest scores are eliminated. Unlike the previous season, scores accrue on all four levels, with ties decided in favor of the competitor who finished the farthest the fastest. The obstacles are suspended over a body of red-tinted water referred to as The Beast Blood (except for Level 3 which has blue-tinted water and is referred to as the Fuel of the Pyramid) and housed in a giant steel frame that takes the form of a large animal. A competitor is considered to have failed a Level if all four limbs are submerged into the Beast Blood/Fuel of the Pyramid. Failure ends the attempt at the current Level but confers no penalties. Competitors have 1,500 seconds (25 minutes) to complete all four levels.

Level 1 
In Level 1 all twelve competitors compete with the top eight scorers moving on.

 Bite Force - Competitors must scale a 30° platform leading to the Grinders.
 Grinder Competit

 Face Plant - Competitors stand on a narrow platform, hands braced against panels on either side, as they are tilted forward to a 45° angle. Then, they must jump to a chain and swing to the  Red Energy Coils. Unlike last season, the chain never becomes a rope at any point in the season.
  Red Energy Coils -  Competitors must jump across a series of 5 semi-stationary hanging platforms at various heights. The first Point Thruster is located next to a side platform. The coils were placed farther apart for the finals. An additional coil is added if the second path is taken.

At the end of the Red Energy Coils, there are two different paths taken, depending on the episode.

Path 1

 Dead Bolts -  Competitors must jump across a series of 4 semi-stationary hanging bolts. A Point Thruster is located underneath the second Deadbolt.
 Mag Wall - Competitors navigate horizontally across a climbing wall. Every 2 seconds (1 second for the finals) the magnetic handholds are released and fall into the Beast's blood. The wall features an inversion, from which the competitors must jump to the finishing platform, which is placed further in the finals. The final Point Thruster is located toward the start of the Mag Wall.

A perfect run will give you a score of 120 points.

Path 2

 Blue Energy Coils -  Competitors must jump across a series of 5 additional semi-stationary hanging platforms, though unlike the regular Energy Coils, these are all at the same height and are closer to each other. A Point Thruster is located in between the first two blue coils.
 Sling Shot - Competitors must use their momentum to swing across a trapeze bar.
 Crash Pads - Similar to the Bungee Beds from season 1's Level 3, competitors must traverse two unstable platforms suspended at varying heights by bungee chords. The final Point Thruster is located in between the two Crash Pads.

Each individual portion of an obstacle is worth five points allowing for a possible total of 90 or 120 Points, depending on Beast configuration. A perfect run will give you a score of 130 points.

Competitors have 360 seconds (6 minutes) to complete Level 1.

Level 2 
In Level 2 the top eight competitors compete, with the top five scorers moving on. All obstacles are lifted from the previous season.

 Spinal Ascent - Competitors must complete a series of vertical jumps, with the largest being 8 feet. Three platforms are fixed, while two are suspended.
 Vertical Descent - Competitors must work their way down through a cable web, the cables becoming thinner and thinner toward the bottom. A Point Thruster is located at the bottom.
 Stomach Churn - Competitors must traverse three spinning platforms all at varying heights.
 Digestive Track - Jumping from the platform into a tube, competitors must climb the tube before it sinks and jump to the next obstacle.
 Dreadmills - Competitors must cross 2 suspended treadmills and leap to a platform. 
 Chain Reaction - Competitors must swing across a series of hanging chains. A Point Thruster is located midway across.
 Vertebrace - Competitors must hop through a series of five suspended vertebrae-shaped hoops and jump to the finish platform. A Point Thruster is located at the left of the second vertebrae.

Each individual portion of an obstacle is worth five points allowing for a possible total of 155 points. Competitors have 420 seconds (7 minutes) to complete Level 2.

Level 3 (Energy Pyramid) 
In Level 3, also known as the Energy Pyramid, the top 5 scorers compete, with the top two advancing to the final level. Unlike the previous season, there is no Easy Way or Hard Way.

 The Ejector - Competitors must mount a 14 MPH (17 MPH for the finals) forward-moving treadmill and attempt to grab a suspended hand-hold (attached to Prism Strike).
 Prism Strike - Competitors must hold onto a hand-hold as it swings through a curved track, then reach for an additional hand-hold located just before the first Coil Crawl. A Point Thruster is located to the side of the first track.
 Coil Crawl - Competitors must work their way through three tubes structure made of pipe and chain before they each sink into the water. A Point Thruster is located after the first Coil Crawl. Each Coil Crawl sinks faster in the finals.
 Hangman- Competitors must scale 15 hanging, triangular rings which retract after a competitor lets go. A Point Thruster is located midway across.
 Pipeline - Competitors must use grip handles to slide up a set of V-shaped bars
 Climbing Wall - Competitors must climb a wall up to the final platform. A Point Thruster is located at the bottom of the wall.

Individual portions of obstacles are worth five points. The highest possible total is 150 points. Competitors have 360 seconds (6 minutes) to complete Level 3.

Level 4 
In Level 4 the top two competitors face each other on an eighty-foot climbing wall. Unlike the previous season, scores from the previous levels are kept and there are no Power Taps.

 Ricochet - Competitors navigate back-and-forth between two walls.
 Full Tilt - Competitors must scale five blocks with two handholds which tilt down as they grab them.
 Mother Board - Competitors must ascend a large pegboard divided into two sections. Two Point Thrusters are located towards the top and bottom,
 Sky Hook - Competitors must cross six hooks with two handholds.
 Ventilator - Competitors must ascend a narrow vertical crevice. A Point Thruster is located midway up with a final Point Thruster at the top of this section worth 200 points.

Competitors are given five minutes to accrue the highest possible score, with ties decided in favor of the competitor who is currently highest on the tower. There is no failure condition for Level 4, and competitors may attempt to regain their footing if they lose grip on the wall.

The Beast (Season 3) 
The obstacle course for the competition is known as The Beast, and it is divided into 3 Levels. Level 4 has been added to the Beast for the Finals. Competitors with the highest scores after each level move on while those with the lowest scores are eliminated, with ties decided in favor of the competitor who finished the farthest the fastest. Unlike the first season (where scores reset on Level 4) and the previous season (where scores accrue on all four levels), all scores reset to 0 at the start of the level and competitors get the farthest the fastest. The obstacles are suspended over a body of red-tinted water  steel frame that takes the form of a large animal. A competitor is considered to have failed a Level if all four limbs are submerged into the Beast Blood/Fuel of the Pyramid. Failure ends the attempt at the current Level but confers no penalties.

This season, in addition to the normal Point Thrusters, a new Mega Thruster has been added, which counts down from any number at any speed. Depending on how fast they hit the Thruster, they get the number of points that they hit the Thruster at. In addition, a final Point Thruster worth 25 points has been added to the end of every level.

This season also features a tournament-style bracket, in which two athletes advance from each episode to a semifinal round then to a final round, earning themselves $10,000, where they fight for the title of Ultimate Beastmaster and $50,000. In the semifinals, the top six competitors compete, with the top three winning $10,000 and moving on to the finals. Competitors must run the entire course (levels 1–4) in one go and get the farthest the fastest. If they fail once, they are given an extra life they can use to try again from one of five checkpoints throughout the course, but at the cost of the points accrued after crossing the checkpoint. Should the competitor choose not to use it, however, the extra life is then forfeited and cannot be used later.

Level 1 
In Level 1 all nine competitors compete with the top six scorers moving on.

 Lock Jaw - Competitors must scale a pole that gets as thin as 8 in. as competitors progress.
 Gear Head - Competitors must cross two gear-like platforms shaped similarly to the Grinder from Season 2. The first one is stationary while the second swings back-and-forth.
 Face Plant - Competitors stand on a narrow platform, hands braced against panels on either side, as they are tilted forward to a 45° angle. They must then jump to a chain and swing to Hyper Jump. The first Point Thruster is located higher up the chain. Unlike previous seasons, the chain is positioned towards the side a bit. This is the first of six checkpoints in the Semifinals.
 Hyper Jump -  Competitors must jump across 2 semi-stationary hanging platforms that start moving once the competitor lands on them. A Point Thruster is located between the platforms. Similar to the Energy Coils from Seasons 1 and 2.

At the end of Hyper Jump, there are two different paths taken, often with interchangeable obstacles, depending on the episode. Competitors can go for the Mag Wall or the Crash Pads.

Path 1

 The Rack -  Competitors must jump across a series of 2 seesaws. A Point Thruster is located in between each seesaw. Interchangeable with Rope Burn or the Dead Bolts; replaced with Break Neck for the Semifinals and Chain Drive for the Finals.
 Rope Burn -  Competitors must use a rope to scale a giant tube that gets wider midway through. A Point Thruster is located just before the tube gets wider. Interchangeable with The Rack or the Dead Bolts; replaced with Break Neck for the Semifinals and Chain Drive for the Finals.
 Dead Bolts -  Competitors must jump across a series of 4 semi-stationary hanging bolts, each at a slightly different angle; the last two are placed 6 ft. apart from each other. A Point Thruster is located between the second and third Deadbolts while a Mega Thruster is located between the last two Deadbolts. Interchangeable with The Rack or Rope Burn; replaced with Break Neck for the Semifinals and Chain Drive for the Finals.
 Break Neck -  Competitors must cross a series of 3 wheels, two of which spin automatically while the second one is stationary, each with 6 pistons, two at the least of which drops down. Exclusive to the Semifinals. Replaced with Chain Drive for the Finals.
 Chain Drive -  Competitors must cross a series of 3 spinning gears, two counter-clockwise and the second clockwise, with 4 dangling pole-ropes. Exclusive to the Finals.
 Mag Wall - Competitors navigate horizontally across a climbing wall. Every 2 seconds the magnetic handholds are released and fall into the Beast's blood. The wall features an inversion, from which the competitors must jump to the finishing platform. A Point Thruster is located toward the start of Mag Wall while a Mega Thruster is located towards the end of the wall.

Path 2

 Wheel Power - Competitors must use their momentum to turn a rolling beam with monkey bars. Interchangeable with Rib Cage Row or Crank Shaft.
 Rib Cage Row - Competitors must swing across 4 sets of bars, the distance between each set as far as 9 ft. the farther competitors go. Interchangeable with Wheel Power or Crank Shaft.
 Crank Shaft - Competitors must cross a rotating beam with 6 heptagonal-platforms. Interchangeable with Wheel Power or Rib Cage Row.
 Crash Pads - Similar to the Bungee Beds from season 1's Level 3, competitors must traverse two unstable platforms suspended at varying heights by bungee chords. A Point Thruster is located near the first Crash Pad while a Mega Thruster is located near the second one.

Each individual portion of an obstacle is worth five points allowing for a possible total of 90 or 120 Points, depending on Beast configuration.

Level 2 
In Level 2 the top six competitors compete, with the top four scorers moving on. Similar to Season 1, some obstacles interchange with each other.

 Drop Zone - Competitors must scale an angled-trampoline to a blue ramp. A Point Thruster is located on the base of the ramp. This is the second of the six checkpoints for the Semifinals.
  
 Pivot Point - Competitors must jump from the ramp to a hexagonal-platform near the base of Digestive Track. The drop is said to be 10 ft down. This is the third of six checkpoints for the Semifinals.
 Digestive Track - Jumping from the platform into a tube, competitors must climb the tube before it sinks and jump to the next obstacle.
 Dreadmills - Competitors must cross a pair of suspended treadmills and leap to a platform. A Point Thruster is located after the second Dreadmill.
 Shape Shifter - Competitors must cross a 30 ft. series of octagonal-footholds. A Point Thruster is located midway across, while a Mega Thruster is located near the end. Replaced with the Sidewinder for the Semifinals and Destabilizer for the Finals.
 Sidewinder - Competitors must cross a series of two bent pipes while hanging on to wheels. A Point Thruster is located midway across. This is the fourth of six checkpoints for the Semifinals. Exclusive to the Semifinals. Replaced with Destabilizer for the Finals.
 Destabilizer - Competitors must jump across a series of three beams suspended by Bungee Cords and placed at different angles. Exclusive to the Finals.
 Tail Whip - Competitors must scale a series of monkey bars set 3 ft apart and can fall at any time. A Point Thruster is located midway across with a Mega Thruster located towards the right.

Each individual portion of an obstacle is worth five points allowing for a possible total of 150 points.

Level 3 
In Level 3, also known as the Energy Pyramid, the top four scorers compete, with the top two advancing to the Semifinals (3 moving on to Level 4 for the Finals.)

 Rail Runner - Competitors must mount a forward-moving treadmill and attempt to grab a suspended a pole-rope (or a regular black rope in some episodes) as it swings through a curved track, then reach for an additional pole-rope/rope located just before Power Surge. 3 Point Thrusters are located at the beginning, middle, and end of the track. This is the fifth of six checkpoints for the Semifinals.
 Power Surge - Competitors must work their way through three tubes structure made of pipe and chain before they each sink into the water. The first is placed vertically while the rest is shaped similarly to the previous seasons' Coil Crawl. In contrast to the previous seasons', the last ring only sinks occasionally. A Mega Thruster is located midway through.
 Viper Climb- Competitors must scale an 80 ft helix. A Point Thruster is located 3/4ths of the way up.
 Pipeline - Competitors must use grip handles to slide up a set of V-shaped bars
 Climbing Wall - Competitors must climb a wall up to the final platform. A Mega Thruster is located at the bottom of the wall.

Individual portions of obstacles are worth five points. The highest possible total is 150 points.

Level 4 
In Level 4 the top three finalists compete on an  climbing wall, with the top 1 winning $50,000 and being crowned the Ultimate Beastmaster. Unlike the previous seasons, this level is exclusive to the Finals, and competitors each compete one-at-a-time. Points can only be attained through three Mega Thrusters placed throughout, each worth 250 points more than the previous Thruster.

 Ricochet - Competitors navigate back-and-forth between two walls. This is the last of six checkpoints for the Semifinals.

At the end of Ricochet, competitors must make a choice between two paths.

 Full Tilt - Competitors must scale six blocks with two handholds which tilt down as they grab them.
 Drop Tank - Competitors must scale three platforms which drop down 18 in. as they step on them.
 Mother Board - Competitors must ascend a large pegboard. The first Mega Thruster (worth 250 points) is located towards the bottom of the board.

At the end of Mother Board, competitors must make a choice between another two paths.

 Razor's Edge - Competitors must cross a shaky bridge made up of trapezoidal platforms.
 Vertigo - Competitors must scale a swirling beam.
 Ventilator - Competitors must ascend in one of three ways:
 Rope Climb - A narrow vertical crevice with a rope positioned left.
 I-Beam Cross - A narrow beam positioned right in the middle that gets thinner as competitors climb up.
 The second Mega Thruster (worth 500 points) is located at the bottom of the I-Beam.
 Chimney Climb - A narrow vertical crevice positioned right.
 The final Mega Thruster (worth 750 points) is located at the top of Ventilator.

Competitors are given unlimited time to accrue the highest possible score, with ties decided in favor of the competitor who finished the fastest. There is no failure condition for Level 4, and competitors may attempt to regain their footing if they lose grip on the wall.

Episodes
 The contestant was named Beastmaster.
 The contestants completed that level.
 The contestant was eliminated on that round.

Episode 1: Beast Nation

Competitors
 Heeyong Park, 34 Ice Climber - Team South Korea - Beastmaster
 Simon Brunner, 18 College Student - Team Germany - Eliminated on Level 4
 Ricardo de Oliviera, 24 Parkour Instructor - Team Brazil - Eliminated on Level 3
 Omar Zamitiz, 36 Rehab Trainer - Team Mexico - Eliminated on Level 3
 Matias Chavez Jimenez, 29 Parkour Athlete - Team Mexico - Eliminated on Level 3
 Markus Ertelt, 37 Actor - Team Germany - Eliminated on Level 2
 Shaun Provost, 26 Obstacle Course Racer - Team USA - Eliminated on Level 2
 Shinobi Poli, 31 Parkour Teacher - Team USA - Eliminated on Level 2
 Toyohiko Kubota, 40 Sports School Owner - Team Japan - Eliminated on Level 1
 Takehide Sato, 34 Crossfit Coach - Team Japan - Eliminated on Level 1
 Myon Tuk Han, 33 Fitness Model - Team South Korea - Eliminated on Level 1
 Karine Abrahim, 31 Hairdresser - Team Brazil - Eliminated on Level 1

Level 1

A perfect run will give you a score of 80 points.

Level 2

Level 3

Level 4

Episode 2: Going for Gold

Competitors
 David Manthei, 20 Architecture Student - Team Germany - Beastmaster
 Ed Moses, 35 Olympic Swimmer - Team USA - Eliminated on Level 4
 Jinbong Lee, 29 Former Special Forces - Team South Korea - Eliminated on Level 3
 Johannes Gmelin, 33 Crossfit Gym Owner - Team Brazil - Eliminated on Level 3
 Koohun Lee, 32 Crossfit Athlete - Team South Korea - Eliminated on Level 3
 Angelica "Wild Rabbit" Melo, 20 Communications Student - Team Mexico - Eliminated on Level 2
 Jacobo Luchtan, 26 Technology Firm COO - Team Mexico - Eliminated on Level 2
 Shoji Nakayama, 37 Comedian - Team Japan - Eliminated on Level 2
 Hanah Jamroz, 21 Online Personal Trainer - Team USA - Eliminated on Level 1
 Marcel Tratnik, 34 Lifeguard - Team Germany - Eliminated on Level 1
 Yoshifumi Fujita, 28 Strongman - Team Japan - Eliminated on Level 1
 Simone de Araujo, 34 Capoeira Instructor - Team Brazil - Eliminated on Level 1

Level 1

Level 2

Level 3

Level 4

Episode 3: The Beast Evolves

Competitors 
 Steven Tucker, 29 Rock Climbing Instructor - Team USA - Beastmaster
 Emmanuel Chiang, 22 Law Student - Team Mexico - Eliminated on Level 4
 Marcel Scarpim, 33 Engineer - Team Brazil - Eliminated on Level 3
 Ryan Scott, 32 Financial Advisor - Team USA - Eliminated on Level 3
 Fernando Casanova, 37 Musician - Team Mexico - Eliminated on Level 3
 Taeyoung Lee, 29 Stunt Director - Team South Korea - Eliminated on Level 2
 Joel Pusitzky, 26 Professional Model - Team Germany - Eliminated on Level 2
 Maki Morishima, 32 Pole Dancer - Team Japan - Eliminated on Level 2
 Carol Valim, 33 Circus Performer - Team Brazil - Eliminated on Level 1
 Kyoung Duck Kang, 33 Personal Trainer - Team South Korea - Eliminated on Level 1
 Hiroyuki Tanaka, 25 Tech Consultant - Team Japan - Eliminated on Level 1
 Kerstin Schoessler, 33 Sport Scientist - Team Germany - Eliminated on Level 1

Level 1

Level 2

Level 3

Level 4

Episode 4: The Legend vs. The Beast

Competitors
 Philip Meyer, 23 Soldier - Team Germany - Beastmaster 
 Taeho Kwon, 31 Actor and Fitness Model - Team South Korea - Eliminated on Level 4 
 Marcel Stevanin, 25 Parkour Athlete - Team Brazil - Eliminated on Level 3 
 Eduardo Oliveira, 33 PE Teacher, Team Brazil - Eliminated on Level 3 
 Yuji Urushihara, 37 Shoes Salesman/Sasuke Legend - Team Japan - Eliminated on Level 3 
 Jonas Kegelmann, 19 Parkour Instructor - Team Germany - Eliminated on Level 2 
 Jalil Al Akabani, 29 Store Owner - Team Mexico - Eliminated on Level 2 
 Jongsuk Kim, 26 Personal Trainer - Team South Korea - Eliminated on Level 2 
 Juan Bernardo, 30 Criminal Lawyer - Team USA - Eliminated on Level 1 
 Yuriko Santander, 32 Electrical Engineer - Team Mexico - Eliminated on Level 1 
 Cortni Joyner, 30 Professional Soccer Player - Team USA - Eliminated on Level 1 
 Yuki Fukumoto, 25 Professional Dancer - Team Japan - Eliminated on Level 1

Level 1

Level 2

Level 3

Level 4

Episode 5: The Battle of Wills

Competitors 
 Roberto Perez, 25 Chemical Engineering Student - Team Mexico - Beastmaster
 Charles Robinson, 25 Retired Marine - Team USA - Eliminated on Level 4
 Philipp Hell, 25 Software Developer - Team Germany - Eliminated on Level 3
 Alfredo Bermudes, 34 Acrobat - Team Brazil - Eliminated on Level 3
 Tomomichi Shiozaki, 28 Firefighter - Team Japan - Eliminated on Level 3
 Satoshi Mashito, 38 Arm Wrestler - Team Japan - Eliminated on Level 2
 Chico Salgado, 33 Martial Arts Instructor - Team Brazil - Eliminated on Level 2
 Todd Wise, 29 Crossfit Gym Owner - Team USA - Eliminated on Level 2
 Gundam Kim, 35 Personal Trainer - Team South Korea - Eliminated on Level 1
 Georgina "Gina" Castillo, 34 Single Mom - Team Mexico - Eliminated on Level 1
 Sungsoon Chang, 30 Swim Trainer - Team South Korea - Eliminated on Level 1
 Michael Pela, 26 Lawyer - Team Germany - Eliminated on Level 1

Level 1

Level 2

Level 3

Level 4

Episode 6: Beauty Meets the Beast

Competitors 
 Hyunho Kim, 30 Crossfit trainer - South Korea - Beastmaster
 Santiago López, 29 Wine Maker - Mexico - Eliminated on Level 4
 Trevor Carter, 32 Firefighter -  United States - Eliminated on Level 3
 Silke Sollfrank, 18 Student - Germany - Eliminated on Level 3
 Akio Shimofuji, 29 Office employee - Japan - Eliminated on Level 3
 Phelipe Young, 25 Circus acrobat - Brazil - Eliminated on Level 2
 Marco Cerullo, 27 Bartender - Germany - Eliminated on Level 2
 Daesung Oh, 31 Personal Trainer -  South Korea - Eliminated on Level 2
 Guilherme Medeiros, 35 Special police (BOPE) - Brazil - Eliminated on Level 1
 Júlio Códova, 28 Jiu Jitsu fighter - Mexico - Eliminated on Level 1
 Eiji Semba, 28 Personal Trainer - Japan - Eliminated on Level 1
 Lindsay Andrew, 33 Crossfit athlete - United States - Eliminated on Level 1

Level 1

Level 2

Level 3

Level 4

Episode 7: Beast Mode

Competitors 
 Felipe Camargo, 24 Professional Climber - Team Brazil - Beastmaster
Completed Level 4 in 5:09
 Ludwig Hefele, 18 Physics Student - Team Germany - Eliminated on Level 4
 César Curti, 29 Mahamudra Instructor - Team Brazil - Eliminated on Level 3
 Ivan Zepeda, 20 Cheerleader - Team Mexico - Eliminated on Level 3
 Chang Suk Bang, 35 Former Special Forces - Team South Korea - Eliminated on Level 3
 Woochul Kim, 34 Basketball Player - Team South Korea - Eliminated on Level 2
 Steffen Zimmermann, 25 Psychologist - Team Germany - Eliminated on Level 2
 Daigo Nakano, 28 Physiotherapist - Team Japan - Eliminated on Level 2
 Kaori Sakai, 30 Service representative - Team Japan - Eliminated on Level 1
 Thaily Amezcua, 37 Novel Actress - Team Mexico - Eliminated on Level 1
 Mimi Bonny, 31 Entrepreneur - Team USA - Eliminated on Level 1
 Brandon Douglass, 27 Parkour Athlete - Team USA - Eliminated on Level 1

Level 1

Level 2

Level 3

Level 4

Episode 8: Brother vs. Brother

Competitors
 Jonathan Collins, 33 Track Coach and Model - Team USA - Beastmaster
 Yungyung Kim, 20 Gymnast - Team South Korea - Eliminated on Level 4
 Tabito Okayasu, 29 Actor - Team Japan - Eliminated on Level 3
 Adrien Ngouah-Ngally, 19 Mover and Student - Team Germany - Eliminated on Level 3
 Yoshitaro Fujiwara, 27 Professional Trainer - Team Japan - Eliminated on Level 3
 Adrian Raya, 31 Frontenis Player - Team Mexico - Eliminated on Level 2
 Yunhwan Kim, 22 Gymnast - Team South Korea - Eliminated on Level 2
 Marcelo Munhoz, 23 Triathlon Athlete - Team Brazil - Eliminated on Level 2
 Rafael Picolo, 31 Surf Instructor - Team Brazil - Eliminated on Level 1
 Julia Habitzreither, 30 Medical Student - Team Germany - Eliminated on Level 1
 Isaiah Stanback, 31 Ex NFL Player - Team USA - Eliminated on Level 1
 Claudia Lopez, 33 Lawyer - Team Mexico - Eliminated on Level 1

Level 1

Level 2

Level 3

Level 4

Episode 9: The Last Call

Competitors
 Ken Corigliano, 35 Air Force Major - Team USA - Beastmaster
 Nam Vo, 25 Mechanical Engineering Student - Team Germany - Eliminated on Level 4
 Bruno Nogueira, 30 US Army Veteran - Team Brazil - Eliminated on Level 3
 Brian Redard, 30 Personal Trainer - Team USA - Eliminated on Level 3
 Taeyoon Kim, 26 Parkour Coach - Team Korea - Eliminated on Level 3
 Mitsuteru Tanaka, 28 Muscleman Entertainer - Team Japan - Eliminated on Level 2
 Woosung Yu, 35 Mixed Martial Arts Fighter - Team Korea - Eliminated on Level 2
 Keita Omura, 29 Jiu Jitsu Champion - Team Japan - Eliminated on Level 2
 Alexander Schmidt, 24 Professional Acrobat - Team Germany - Eliminated on Level 1
 Abe Green, 32 Graphic Designer - Team Mexico - Eliminated on Level 1
 Amancay Gonzalez, 26 Athletic Spokesperson - Team Mexico - Eliminated on Level 1
 Mirella Araujo, 39 Dancer - Team Brazil - Eliminated on Level 1

Level 1

Level 2

Level 3

Level 4

Episode 10: Season 1 Finale

Competitors
 Felipe Camargo, 24 Professional Climber - Team Brazil - Ultimate Beastmaster
6:47
 Jonathan Collins, 33 Track Coach and Model - Team USA - Eliminated on Level 3
 Roberto Perez, 25 Chemical Engineering Student - Team Mexico - Eliminated on Level 2
 Hyunho Kim, 30 Crossfit Trainer - Team Korea - Eliminated on Level 2
 Steven Tucker, 29 Rock Climbing Instructor - Team USA - Eliminated on Level 1
 David Manthei, 20 Architecture Student - Team Germany - Eliminated on Level 1
 Phillip Meyer, 23 Soldier - Team Germany - Eliminated on Level 1
 Heeyong Park, 34 Ice Climber - Team Korea - Eliminated on Level 4
6:49
 Ken Corigliano, 35 Air Force Major - Team USA - Eliminated on Level 2 with injury

Level 1

Level 2

Level 3

Level 4

Episode 1: The Beast Within

Competitors
 Mickaël Mawem, 26 Professional Boulderer - Team France - Beastmaster
0:22 faster
 Bassa Mawem, 32 Professional Speed Climber - Team France - Eliminated on Level 4
 Luca Rinaldi, 26 Land Surveyor - Team Italy - Eliminated on Level 3
 Felix Chu, 33 Obstacle Course Racer - Team USA - Eliminated on Level 3
 Alex Segura, 22 Marketing Student - Team Spain - Eliminated on Level 3
 Dong Li, 25 Parkour Instructor - Team China - Eliminated on Level 2
 Gianni Guglielmo, 33 Taekwondo Champion - Team Italy - Eliminated on Level 2
 Vishwanath Bhaskar, 25 Powerlifting Champion - Team India - Eliminated on Level 2
 Vikas Krishan Yadav, 25 Olympic Boxer - Team India - Eliminated on Level 1
 Lorena González, 34 Nurse - Team Spain - Eliminated on Level 1
 Jessica Hill, 27 Professional Acrobat - Team USA - Eliminated on Level 1
 Dan Zeng, 39 Financial Advisor - Team China - Eliminated on Level 1

Level 1

Level 2

Level 3

Level 4

Episode 2: Out for Blood

Competitors
 Haibin Qu, 24 Rock Climbing Instructor - Team China - Beastmaster
0:02 faster
 Miguel Espada, 24 Stuntman - Team Spain - Eliminated on Level 4
 Remi Fantino, 30 Dentist - Team France - Eliminated on Level 3
 Gabe Baker, 25 Civil Engineer - Team USA - Eliminated on Level 3
 Laura Mété, 28 Pole Dance Instructor - Team France - Eliminated on Level 3
 Antonio Bosso, 21 Youth Leader - Team Italy - Eliminated on Level 2
 Natalie Strasser, 31 Stuntwoman - Team USA - Eliminated on Level 2
 Sumir Kapoor, 25 B-Boy Dancer - Team India - Eliminated on Level 2
 Peng Wu, 27 Personal Trainer - Team China - Eliminated on Level 1
 Lluís Barbé, 35 Physiotherapist - Team Spain - Eliminated on Level 1
 Aditya Shroff, 38 Film Distributor - Team India - Eliminated on Level 1
 Arianna Bonardi, 25 Bodybuilder - Team Italy - Eliminated on Level 1

Level 1

Level 2

Level 3

Level 4

Episode 3: Taming the Beast

Competitors 
 Kyle Soderman, 22 Obstacle Course Coach - Team USA - Beastmaster
 Yoann Leroux, 30 Professional Freerunner - Team France - Eliminated on Level 4
 Yunpeng Zhang, 23 Stuntman - Team China - Eliminated on Level 3
 Tiziano Battista, 27 Body Shop Mechanic - Team Italy - Eliminated on Level 3
 Rishi Prasad, 27 ER Doctor - Team India - Eliminated on Level 3
 Aitor Dominguez, 30 Physiotherapist - Team Spain - Eliminated on Level 2
 Jeremey Adam Rey, 23 Dance Instructor - Team USA - Eliminated on Level 2
 Lisa Sarcinelli, 35 Parkour Gym Owner - Team Italy - Eliminated on Level 2
 Francisco Gascó, 32 Paleontologist - Team Spain - Eliminated on Level 1
 Mathilde Becerra, 25 Professional Climber - Team France - Eliminated on Level 1
 Feng Wan, 36 Climbing Gym Manager - Team China - Eliminated on Level 1
 Urmi Kothari, 31 Fitness Trainer - Team India - Eliminated on Level 1

Level 1 
Level 1 Configuration: Bite Force, Grinders, Faceplant, Energy Coils, Dead Bolts, Mag Wall

Level 2

Level 3

Level 4

Episode 4: The Heart of the Beast

Competitors
 Yiqi Li, 24 Parkour Instructor - Team China - Beastmaster 
 Brian Ludovici, 19 Physics Student - Team USA - Eliminated on Level 4 
 Alex Picazo, 31 Wrestling Coach - Team USA - Eliminated on Level 3 
 Mujahid Habib, 24 Architect - Team India - Eliminated on Level 3 
 Valentin Dubois, 25 Parkour Athlete - Team France - Eliminated on Level 3 
 Jianguo Fang, 27 Personal Trainer - Team China - Eliminated on Level 2 
 Matteo Della Bordella, 32 Professional Alpinist - Team Italy - Eliminated on Level 2 
 Raúl Beltrán, 28 Navy Search and Rescue - Team Spain - Eliminated on Level 2 
 TJ García, 34 Physiotherapist - Team Spain - Eliminated on Level 1 
 Ritesh Shaiwal, 29 Mountaineer - Team India - Eliminated on Level 1 
 Sandra Large, 33 Nanny - Team France - Eliminated on Level 1 
 Serena Jura, 30 Obstacle Race Trainer - Team Italy - Eliminated on Level 1

Level 1

Level 2

Level 3

Level 4

Episode 5: The Beast Gets Schooled

Competitors 
 John Gerzik, 31 High School Physics Teacher - Team USA - Beastmaster
 Alberto Cipriano, 22 Optometrist - Team Italy - Eliminated on Level 4
 Shuai Tian, 32 Noodle Bar Owner - Team China - Eliminated on Level 3
 Cyrus Khan, 20 Physics Student - Team India - Eliminated on Level 3
 Lorenzo Russo, 29 Tattoo Artist - Team Italy - Eliminated on Level 2
 Jiebin Huang, 20 Kinesiology Student - Team China - Eliminated on Level 2
 Crystal Demopoulos, 28 MMA Fighter - Team USA - Eliminated on Level 2
 Pedro Carrasco, 31 Aerial Acrobat - Team Spain - Eliminated on Level 2 with Injury
 Claire Buat, 23 Parkour Teacher - Team France - Eliminated on Level 1
 Remi Papalia, 28 Firefighter - Team France - Eliminated on Level 1
 Andrea Montero, 25 OCR Athlete - Team Spain - Eliminated on Level 1
 Neeraj Goyat, 24 Boxer - Team India - Eliminated on Level 1

Level 1

Level 2

Level 3

Level 4

Episode 6: The Battle Rages On

Competitors 
 Bin Xie, 24 Ex-Navy Special Ops - Team China - Beastmaster
 Clément Dumais, 23 Parkour Athlete - Team France - Eliminated on Level 4
 Marc Vela, 22 Pole Vault Champion - Team Spain - Eliminated on Level 3
 Minghua He (Andy), 20 Business Student - Team China - Eliminated on Level 3
 Giles D'Souza, 27 Special Forces Trainer - Team India - Eliminated on Level 3
 Andres Encinales, 28 MMA Fighter/Naval Officer - Team USA - Eliminated on Level 2
 Samuel Muñoz, 40 Firefighter - Team Spain - Eliminated on Level 2
 Abhinav Mahajan, 25 Motivational Speaker - Team India - Eliminated on Level 1 with Injury
 Myra Robinson, 34 Foster Parent - Team USA - Eliminated on Level 1
 Aude Brignone, 24 IT Saleswoman - Team France - Eliminated on Level 1
 Francesca Indelicato, 21 Wrestler - Team Italy - Eliminated on Level 1
 Pietro Lalla, 43 Hip Hop Dancer - Team Italy - Eliminated on Level 1
5:00 Time Limit on Level 4

Level 1

Level 2

Level 3

Level 4

Episode 7: Scaling the Beast

Competitors 
 Manuel Cornu, 22 Professional Boulderer - Team France - Beastmaster
0:03 faster
 Axel Dupre, 28 Parkour Instructor - Team France - Eliminated on Level 4
 Juan Andres Villa, 34 Wind Turbine Technician - Team Spain - Eliminated on Level 3
 Gabriele Consentino, 26 Professional Swimmer - Team Italy - Eliminated on Level 3
 Praveen CM, 31 Rock Climbing Instructor - Team India - Eliminated on Level 3
 Alejandro Valdivia, 35 Chef - Team USA - Eliminated on Level 2
 Kraig Shorter, 32 Church Worship Leader - Team USA - Eliminated on Level 2
 Hao Zhao, 32 Marketing Executive - Team China - Eliminated on Level 2
 Chopsy Singh, 30 Fashion Designer - Team India - Eliminated on Level 1
 Nerea Povedano, 32 Ballet Dancer - Team Spain - Eliminated on Level 1
 Changying Wang, 33 Insurance Sales - Team China - Eliminated on Level 1
 Anna Aita, 29 Pole Dancer - Team Italy - Eliminated on Level 1

Level 1

Level 2

Level 3

Level 4

Episode 8: Trapping the Beast

Competitors
 Bin Fang, 24 Online Retailer - Team China - Beastmaster
 Jian Cui, 26 Stuntman - Team China - Eliminated on Level 4
 Léopold Hurbin, 23 Parkour Athlete - Team France - Eliminated on Level 3
 Luke Russell, 28 Air Force Medic- Team USA - Eliminated on Level 3
 Grégoire Rezzonico, 23 Obstacle Course Racer - Team France - Eliminated on Level 3
 Alejandra de Castro, 36 OCR Coach - Team Spain - Eliminated on Level 2
 Mauro Pala, 30 Breakdance Instructor - Team Italy - Eliminated on Level 2
 Delson D'Sousa, 28 Stunt Coordinator - Team India - Eliminated on Level 2
 Pablo Sendra, 28 Physical Education Teacher - Team Spain - Eliminated on Level 1
 Alan Rimondi, 28 Personal Trainer - Team Italy - Eliminated on Level 1
 Amanda Cass, 27 Karate Instructor - Team USA - Eliminated on Level 1
 Shruti Kotwal, 24 Speed Skater - Team India - Eliminated on Level 1

Level 1

Level 2

Level 3

Level 4

Episode 9: Making the Cut

Competitors
 Alberto Gotta, 24 Robotics Engineering Student - Team Italy - Beastmaster
 Mehdi Hadim, 21 Economics Student - Team France - Eliminated on Level 4
 Alessio Recchiuto, 20 Street Artist - Team Italy - Eliminated on Level 3
 Nabil Hadim, 21 Acrobat - Team France - Eliminated on Level 3
 Jorge Martin, 23 Teacher - Team Spain - Eliminated on Level 3
 Julio Montenegro Jr., 21 Motivational Speaker - Team USA - Eliminated on Level 2
 Colt Scott, 22 Poly-Sci Student - Team USA - Eliminated on Level 2
 Nupur Shikhare, 30 Celebrity Fitness Trainer - Team India - Eliminated on Level 2
 Biligetu Zhang, 26 Fitness Coach - Team China - Eliminated on Level 1
 Shweta Mehta, 28 Bikini Fitness Model - Team India - Eliminated on Level 1
Miriam Gutiérrez, 33 Boxer - Team Spain - Eliminated on Level 1
 Bin Xu, 34 Ad Agency Copywriter - Team China - Eliminated on Level 1

Level 1

Level 2

Level 3

Level 4

Episode 10: A Beastmaster Is Crowned

Competitors
 Haibin Qu, 24 Rock Climbing Instructor  - Team China - Episode 2 - Ultimate Beastmaster
0:04 faster
 Manuel Cornu, 22 Professional Climber - Team France - Episode 7 - Eliminated on Level 4
 Kyle Soderman, 22 Obstacle Course Coach - Team USA - Episode 3 - Eliminated on Level 3
 John Gerzik, 31 High school Physics Teacher - Team USA - Episode 5 - Eliminated on Level 3
 Yiqi Li , Parkour Instructor - Team China - Episode 4 - Eliminated on Level 2
 Bin Fang, 24 Online Retailer - Team China - Episode 8 - Eliminated on Level 2
 Bin Xie, 24 Ex-Navy Special Ops - Team USA - Episode 6 - Eliminated on Level 1
 Mickael Mawem, 26 Professional Boulderer  - Team Spain - Episode 1 - Eliminated on Level 1
 Alberto Gotta, 24 Robotics Engineering Student - Team Italy - Episode 9 - Eliminated on Level 1

Level 1

Level 2

Level 3

Level 4

Episode 1: The Beast Evolves

Competitors
 Max Sprenger, 22 Media and Computer Science Student - Team Germany - Semifinalist
 James Drake, 36 Non-Profit Director - Team USA - Semifinalist
 Javier Lopez, 21 Gymnast - Team Mexico - Eliminated on Level 3
 Sung Hyuk Choi, 36 Pole Dancer - Team South Korea - Eliminated on Level 3
 Nathan Caparros, 24 Climbing Instructor - Team France - Eliminated on Level 2
 Gareth Leah, 30 Travel Writer - Team UK - Eliminated on Level 2
 Edoardo Bocchio Vega, 23 Environmental Policy Student - Team Italy - Eliminated on Level 1
 Morgan-Rose Moroney, 20 Physiotherapy Student - Team Australia - Eliminated on Level 1
 Mauro Yoshida, 29 Gym Owner - Team Brazil - Eliminated on Level 1

Level 1
Level 1 Configuration: Lockjaw, Gear Head, Faceplant, Hyper Jump, The Rack, Mag Wall

Level 2

Level 3

Episode 2: Champions Collide

Competitors
 Jayden Irving, 26 Surfer - Team Australia - Semifinalist
 David Ferguson, 27 Professional Muay Thai Boxer - Team UK - Semifinalist
 Dre Nuzum, 23 Dance Instructor - Team USA - Eliminated on Level 3
 Matteo Curiel, 29 Personal Trainer - Team Italy - Eliminated on Level 3
 Gaël Le Moigne, 28 Renewable Energy Entrepreneur - Team France - Eliminated on Level 2
 Jessica Wielens, 30 Alternative Medicine Practitioner - Team Germany - Eliminated on Level 2
 Aida Alanis, 30 Gym Owner - Team Mexico - Eliminated on Level 1
 Jabee Kim, 31 Professional Climber - Team South Korea - Eliminated on Level 1
 Felipe Ho Foganholo, 18 Professional Climber - Team Brazil - Eliminated on Level 1

Level 1
Level 1 Configuration: Lockjaw, Gear Head, Faceplant, Hyper Jump, Wheel Power, Crash Pads

Level 2

Level 3

Episode 3: Strive for Greatness

Competitors 
 Keiha Dhruev, 23 Climbing Instructor - Team UK - Semifinalist
 Miguel Angel Hernandez, 35 Aerial Acrobat - Team Mexico - Semifinalist
 Elvis Gjeci, 23 Gymnastics Coach - Team Italy - Eliminated on Level 3
 Thomas Ballet, 28 Human Resources Consultant - Team France - Eliminated on Level 3
 Chloé Henry, 30 Pole Vaulter - Team USA - Eliminated on Level 2
 Jun Kim, 29 Photographer - Team Germany - Eliminated on Level 2
 Patricia Antunes Silva, 31 Chef - Team Brazil - Eliminated on Level 1
 David Georgiou, 30 Gym Owner - Team Australia - Eliminated on Level 1
 Nae Yun Yang, 26 Swimming Coach - Team South Korea - Eliminated on Level 1

Level 1 
Level 1 Configuration: Lockjaw, Gear Head, Faceplant, Hyper Jump, Rope Burn, Mag Wall

Level 2

Level 3

Episode 4: Semifinal #1

Competitors
 Jayden Irving, 26 Surfer - Team Australia - Episode 2 - Finalist
 Max Sprenger, 22 Media and Computer Science Student - Team Germany - Episode 1 - Finalist
 James Drake 36 Non-Profit Director - Team USA - Episode 1 - Finalist
 David Ferguson, 27 Muay Thai Boxer - Team UK - Episode 2 - Eliminated
 Keiha Dhruev, 23 Climbing Instructor - Team UK - Episode 3 - Eliminated
 Miguel Angel Hernandez, 35 Aerial Acrobat - Team Mexico - Episode 3 - Eliminated

Level 1 Configuration: Lockjaw, Gear Head, Faceplant, Hyper Jump, Break Neck, Mag Wall

Episode 5: A New Battle Begins

Competitors 
 Jesse Turner, 27 Stuntman - Team Australia - Semifinalist
 Norman Lichtenberg, 24 Parkour Performer - Team Germany - Semifinalist
 Laura Basta, 26 Circus Acrobatic Instructor - Team France - Eliminated on Level 3
 Austin Raye, 27 Social Media Influencer - Team USA - Eliminated on Level 3
 Rafael De Sousa, 32 Gymnastics Instructor - Team Brazil - Eliminated on Level 2
 Angelika Rainer, 30 Professional Ice Climber - Team Italy - Eliminated on Level 2
 Jong Seok Son, 28 Speed Climber - Team South Korea - Eliminated on Level 1
 Andrew French, 30 Design Engineer - Team UK - Eliminated on Level 1
 Allan Cardoso, 19 Business Management Student - Team Mexico - Eliminated on Level 1 with Injury

Level 1 
Level 1 Configuration: Lockjaw, Gear Head, Faceplant, Hyper Jump, Rib Cage Row, Crash Pads

Level 2

Level 3

Episode 6: Overcoming the Odds

Competitors 
 Hector Martinez, 20 Professional Climber - Team Mexico - Semifinalist
 Mark Greenham, 30 Fashion Designer - Team Australia - Semifinalist
 Marty Bartow, 22 Rock Climbing Instructor - Team USA - Eliminated on Level 3
 Dave Ardito Rioja, 29 Filmmaker - Team Germany - Eliminated on Level 3
 Min Je Joo, 33 Spin Instructor - Team South Korea - Eliminated on Level 2
 Imogen Horrocks, 18 Champion Climber - Team UK - Eliminated on Level 2
 Alessandro Cazzavacca, 30 Landscaper - Team Italy - Eliminated on Level 1
 Thalisson Glaner Fagundes, 30 Soccer Coach - Team Brazil - Eliminated on Level 1
 Nicolas Cerquant, 31 Fitness Club Owner - Team France - Eliminated on Level 1

Level 1 
Level 1 Configuration: Lockjaw, Gear Head, Faceplant, Hyper Jump, Crank Shaft, Crash Pads

Level 2

Level 3

Episode 7: For the Glory

Competitors 
 Luke Shelton,  29 Construction Worker - Team Australia - Semifinalist
 Corbin Mackin, 29 Veteran - Team UK - Semifinalist
 Roberto Del Pozzo, 23 Parkour Teacher - Team Italy - Eliminated on Level 3
 Walker Kearney, 36 Stay-At-Home Dad - Team USA - Eliminated on Level 3
 Bernardo Massuchin, 25 Criminal Lawyer - Team Brazil - Eliminated on Level 2
 Mauricio Martinez, 33 Personal Fitness Trainer - Team Mexico - Eliminated on Level 2
 Gemma Lee, 31 Crossfit Trainer - Team South Korea - Eliminated on Level 1
 Mathieu Sarouti, 32 Aeronautical Engineer - Team France - Eliminated on Level 1
 Alix Arndt, 38 Agricultural Sales - Team Germany - Eliminated on Level 1

Level 2

Level 3

Episode 8: Semifinal #2

Competitors
 Mark Greenham, 30 Fashion Designer - Team Australia - Episode 6 - Finalist
 Hector Martinez, 20 Professional Climber - Team Mexico - Episode 6 - Finalist
 Corbin Mackin, 29 Veteran - Team UK - Episode 7 - Finalist
 Jesse Turner, 27 Stuntman - Team Australia - Episode 5 - Eliminated
 Norman Lichtenberg, 24 Parkour Performer - Team Germany - Episode 5 - Eliminated
 Luke Shelton, 29 Construction Worker - Team Australia - Episode 7 - Eliminated

Level 1 Configuration: Lockjaw, Gear Head, Faceplant, Hyper Jump, Break Neck , Mag Wall

Episode 9: The Ultimate Beastmaster Championship

Competitors
 Corbin Mackin, 29 Veteran - Team UK - Episode 7 - Ultimate Beastmaster
 Max Sprenger Media and Computer Science Student - Team Germany - Episode 1 - Eliminated on Level 4
 Jayden Irving, 26 Surfer - Team Australia - Episode 2 - Eliminated on Level 4
 James Drake Non-Profit Director - Team USA - Episode 1 - Eliminated on Level 3
 Mark Greenham, 30 Fashion Designer - Team Australia - Episode 6 - Eliminated on Level 2
 Hector Martinez, 20 Professional Climber - Team Mexico - Episode 6 - Eliminated on Level 1

Level 1
Level 1 Configuration: Lockjaw, Gear Head, Faceplant, Hyper Jump, Chain Drive, Mag Wall

Level 2

Level 3

Level 4

Seasons

Season 1

Season 1 premiered on Netflix on February 24, 2017. The season was filmed in Santa Clarita, California, over the course of eight nights. Felipe Camargo of Brazil was the Ultimate Beastmaster winner for placing first.

Season 2

Prior to the release of season 1, Netflix had already ordered and shot season 2. The second season premiered on Netflix on December 15, 2017, with contestants from the United States, Spain, France, Italy, China and India. Haibin Qu of China was crowned the Ultimate Beastmaster for placing first and completing the entire course in the final.

Season 3

In February 2018 the show was renewed for a third season, consisting of nine episodes. The third season features the United States, Brazil, Germany, Mexico, South Korea, France, Italy, United Kingdom and Australia. Season 3 was released on August 31, 2018. Season 3 featured a tournament-style bracket, in which two athletes advanced from each episode to a semifinal round, then to a final round where they fought for the title of Ultimate Beastmaster. Corbin Mackin of the United Kingdom was crowned Beastmaster for placing first.

Beastmasters

Reception
James Hibberd compares the first season of Ultimate Beastmaster related to American Ninja Warrior in a mixed review of the shows. Hibberd praises Ultimate Beastmasters "gorgeous superstructure" of a course, the international rivalry aspect and concise contestant profile clips, but criticizes the show's commentators and the repetitiveness of the course, the latter of which American Ninja Warrior avoids.

See also
 Sasuke (TV series)

References

External links
 
 

English-language Netflix original programming
Obstacle racing television game shows
2017 American television series debuts
2018 American television series endings
Reality competition television series